Estelline is a city in Hamlin County, South Dakota, United States. It is part of the Watertown, South Dakota Micropolitan Statistical Area. The population was 749 at the 2020 census. The current mascot for Estelline High School is the Redhawks.

History
A post office was first established at Estelline in 1879. Estelline was platted in 1882. The city was named for a local farmer's daughter.

Geography

Estelline has been assigned the ZIP code 57234 and the FIPS place code 19980.

Demographics

2010 census
At the 2010 census there were 768 people in 297 households, including 189 families, in the city. The racial makup of the city was 93.1% White, 0.7% Native American, 5.2% from other races, and 1.0% from two or more races. Hispanic or Latino of any race were 6.3%.

Of the 297 households 30.0% had children under the age of 18 living with them, 47.5% were married couples living together, 9.1% had a female householder with no husband present, 7.1% had a male householder with no wife present, and 36.4% were non-families. 31.3% of households were one person and 15.8% were one person aged 65 or older. The average household size was 2.40 and the average family size was 2.98.

The median age was 40.9 years. 25.8% of residents were under the age of 18; 6.6% were between the ages of 18 and 24; 21.7% were from 25 to 44; 19% were from 45 to 64; and 26.8% were 65 or older. The gender makeup of the city was 47.3% male and 52.7% female.

2000 census
At the 2000 census there were 675 people in 290 households, including 173 families, in the city. The population density was 703.8 people per square mile (271.5/km2). There were 311 housing units at an average density of 324.3 per square mile (125.1/km2).  The racial makup of the city was 98.67% White, 0.74% Native American, 0.15% Asian, and 0.44% from two or more races. Hispanic or Latino of any race were 1.48%. 32.1% were of German, 22.0% Norwegian, 8.7% Irish, 6.8% American and 5.3% Dutch ancestry according to Census 2000.

Of the 290 households 24.1% had children under the age of 18 living with them, 53.8% were married couples living together, 3.8% had a female householder with no husband present, and 40.3% were non-families. 37.2% of households were one person and 21.4% were one person aged 65 or older. The average household size was 2.13 and the average family size was 2.82.

The age distribution was 21.2% under the age of 18, 3.9% from 18 to 24, 22.1% from 25 to 44, 18.5% from 45 to 64, and 34.4% 65 or older. The median age was 48 years. For every 100 females, there were 91.8 males. For every 100 females age 18 and over, there were 84.7 males.

The median household income was $27,679 and the median family income  was $36,250. Males had a median income of $28,393 versus $22,222 for females. The per capita income for the city was $14,967. About 4.4% of families and 12.7% of the population were below the poverty line, including 9.7% of those under age 18 and 22.2% of those age 65 or over.

References

Cities in South Dakota
Cities in Hamlin County, South Dakota
Watertown, South Dakota micropolitan area
1879 establishments in Dakota Territory